James Mangrum (born March 30, 1948), better known as Jim "Dandy" Mangrum, is the lead singer and frontman for the American Southern rock band Black Oak Arkansas. He is noted for his raspy voice, long hair, and wild stage antics.

Early life
Mangrum was born in the town of Benton Harbor, Michigan, where his Arkansas-born parents were working at the time. The family returned to their home state and raised Mangrum in the small town of Black Oak, Arkansas. He was brought up a Southern Baptist and attended Monette High School, in Monette, Arkansas.

Black Oak Arkansas
While in high school, Mangrum and classmate Rickie Lee Reynolds formed a band named The Knowbody Else.   For a season, Reynolds' younger brother, Danny, played bass guitar with the band. Ronnie Smith of Paragould, Arkansas, a close friend of theirs, joined the band as an additional vocalist and went on to become the band's stage production manager, continuing as stage manager long into the "Black Oak Arkansas" years.  In 1966, Mangrum and members of the group stole musical equipment from Monette high school and Manila high school, and were arrested for grand larceny. They were sentenced to 26 years at the Tucker Prison Farm; however, the sentence was suspended.<ref>http://www.classicbands.com, Interview by Gary James with Jim "Dandy" Mangrum, retrieved on 2009-12-11</ref> Mangrum and his group left Arkansas, and moved first to New Orleans, and then to Memphis, Tennessee. In 1970, they traveled to Los Angeles where they signed with Atco Records and released their self-titled first album with their new name Black Oak Arkansas.

In 1973, they released their most successful album, High on the Hog, which reached  number 52 in the charts. One of the songs from the album, "Jim Dandy", which was a cover of the 1955 LaVern Baker song, reached number 25 in the Billboard charts, and became their best known single and Mangrum's signature song. It also featured female vocalist Ruby Starr, who traded off vocals with Mangrum.

In 1982, he was involved in a car accident, and broke three vertebrae; however by 1984 he had recovered, and was back performing.

, Mangrum continues to record and tour with a series of different Black Oak Arkansas lineups.

Black Oak Arkansas's last album was Back Thar N' Over Yonder'' on Atlantic Records in 2013. The album received high marks in nearly all reviews, and featured a 2013 reunion of former band members as well as unreleased tracks from the heyday of the band in the 1970s. Black Oak Arkansas Underdog Heroes was released May 24, 2019 under Cleopatra Records featuring Sammy B. Seauphine, who has been in the band since 2014 and is Jim Dandy's business partner, and Shawn Lane. Upcoming release of a new cover album called On Top of the Covers with Cleopatra Records end of 2023. Featuring Sammy B. Seauphine, Tim Rossi formerly of Blackoot, and Kinley Wolfe formerly of the Cult and Lord Tracy. Current touring members are Jim Dandy,  Sammy B.Seauphine, Tim Rossi, Kinley Wolfe, and Sammi Jo Bishop. Currently touring with Mason Stills.

Discography 
See: Black Oak Arkansas

References 

Living people
1948 births
American male singers
American rock singers
Southern Baptists
People from Craighead County, Arkansas
Baptists from Arkansas